Mohammed Ahmad (Arabic:محمد أحمد) (born 3 September 1992) is an Emirati footballer who plays as a midfielder for Al Bataeh.

Career
He formerly played for Al-Shabab, Hatta, Dibba Al-Hisn, and Ajman.

External links

References

1992 births
Living people
Emirati footballers
Al Shabab Al Arabi Club Dubai players
Ajman Club players
Hatta Club players
Dibba Al-Hisn Sports Club players
Al Bataeh Club players
UAE Pro League players
UAE First Division League players
Association football midfielders
Place of birth missing (living people)